Book Burner is the fifth studio album by American grindcore band Pig Destroyer. It was released on October 22, 2012, through Relapse Records. The deluxe edition includes a short story by J.R. Hayes entitled "The Atheist" and an EP of hardcore punk covers. Vocalist J.R. Hayes stated that the band's only goal for Book Burner was "fast/brutal" and expressed happiness over the abundance of songs on the album with shorter lengths. Guitarist Scott Hull also affirmed that the band's goal was "shorter grind" on Book Burner in contrast with the preceding full-length album, Phantom Limb.

Background
There was a five-year gap between Book Burner and its predecessor, Phantom Limb. Guitarist Scott Hull explained that "there was a lot of adversity that we had to go through to get this record done", which explained the delay: "A lot of changing, of breaking down and rebuilding the equipment and the places that we used and the people we worked with, the approach that we follow to come up with the material. Just getting the goddamn CD done was a whole ordeal."

During this time, drummer Brian Harvey was replaced by Adam Jarvis. Vocalist J.R. Hayes remarked that the band's relationship with Harvey had "run its course" such that he "wasn't prepared to continue with the status quo". Hull described Harvey as "checking out mentally" and "cancelling a lot of practices and not showing up and not really practicing on his own", which led to the band determining near the end of 2010 that "it wasn't going to work out...That's when some blowout happened and he was left to go on his own path".

Hayes noted that the span of time between albums was due to the band being in "upheaval...There was a time when I wasn't sure if the band would go on or not. It took us a while to put ourselves back together." Hull attributed the band's back-to-basics approach to the addition of Jarvis: "Getting a new drummer...inspired us to go back to a shorter, faster and louder demo that we prided ourselves in early on." Prior to Jarvis joining the band, Pig Destroyer had rehearsed with Dave Witte several times before an injury and touring commitments with Municipal Waste led him to step aside.

Hull explained that the internal turmoil, particularly the drummer situation, had an impact upon the songwriting for Book Burner:

Book Burner was also written as a reaction to Phantom Limb, which Scott Hull described as "really written as kind of an experiment to explore longer songs and song structures, things that were catchier and thrashier and that had repeats and structures that were pretty standard." Hull revealed that this approach was driven, in part, by Harvey's changing musical interests: "towards the end, it was very difficult to do anything like that [short, fast songs], it was easier to do the mid-pace stuff. But with Adam, we got really inspired to go back to those roots where we just wanted to blast and play really super fast the whole time, so there's a lot of that on Book Burner. It wasn't like we felt like we needed to go back to Prowler in the Yard or Terrifyer intentionally, we just felt like, 'Hey, we can do this again now!'"

Concept
Similar to Phantom Limb, Hayes opted to avoid imparting "as much of an overall theme" to Book Burner "because I think people become too focused on that. And I just want to make it more about individual pieces". However, Hayes did concede that there were links between the individual songs on the album, some of which he was "not even conscious of...[until] other people...basically tell me what the concept is, and what the themes are, and I might not have even been aware of that until somebody says it."

Hayes explained that "Book Burner", the song from which the album drew its title, was based on Julius Caesar's quote, "Men freely believe what they wish." For Hayes, the quote represented:

Recording and production
Prior to recording Book Burner, Pig Destroyer built their own studio, Visceral Sound. As Blake Harrison, who plays electronic instruments for the band, explained, the band "all had a hand in building it" after getting kicked out of their practice space (a basement in former drummer Brian Harvey's parents' house) several years earlier. Scott Hull explained that the time spent building and moving into a new studio, which also served as the band's new practice space, attracted "a big liability of falling into a kind of a slump. So when we finally got back to where we were practicing in the new place, we were out of practice, trying to get back into fighting shape for new material, let alone the old setlist material. It was very laborious. It felt like we were dragging an anchor behind us the whole time".

The album was also informed by the band's experience at a third-party studio for the recording of Phantom Limb, which caused Harrison to remark that "I'm not gonna name any names, but Scott mixed Phantom Limb, and it was because the people we were working with didn't really 'get' what we were trying to do". Hull elaborated that "we wanted to maintain control over getting the sounds and our environment and stuff so in that sense it was a lot easier for us to record here having built the studio, having the equipment and making sure that everything sounded the way it needed to sound". Hull explained his goal in producing the album:

Deluxe edition
In addition to the album, a seven-song EP composed of covers entitled Blind, Deaf & Bleeding, and a short story entitled "The Atheist" were included in deluxe versions of Book Burner. The Blind, Deaf & Bleeding EP focused on American hardcore songs from the 1980s, such as Black Flag and Circle Jerks. The story, written by Hayes, was described by the author as "only very loosely" based on the album concept, as he "didn't want to tie it in too much, since the story was only going to be included with the deluxe version". Instead, Hayes suggested, "there are a couple peripheral tie-ins" between the book and the album, including the appearance of the phrase "book burner" in both. "You might say the philosophical ideas of mental independence and fighting for your right to think for yourself are also tied to the record", Hayes explained. Hayes summarized the plot for "The Atheist" as being "about a guy who grew up as a Christian and in early adulthood decides he didn't want to be a Christian. He becomes a biology teacher. Then the U.S. descends into a theocracy and becomes very fascist. Everyone converts and he's like 'fuck it.' He abandons his wife and society and lives in the woods like a crazy person." In the "thanks" portion of the liner notes, Hayes dedicates "The Atheist" to author Christopher Hitchens.

Reception

The album received "universal acclaim" according to Metacritic. Denise Falzon praised Book Burner in Exclaim! for going "back to basics with whiplash-fast tracks" with a streamlined approach that "manage[s] to surpass expectations with a less-is-more approach that results in a thoroughly mind-blowing record." Writing for Pitchfork, Jess Harvell described the album as "utterly ugly, thoroughly alienating stuff that doesn't give half a shit if you can stomach its musical and spiritual violence" and noted that it was "less user-friendly than Phantom Limb". Ray Van Horn Jr. wrote for Blabbermouth.net that Book Burner was "perhaps the most metal album of 2012" and drew attention to the band's "gauntlet of blitzing grind and thrash modes" while noting the band's approach resembled the "old days of hardcore only with the benefit of modern technology". Loudwire's Graham Hartmann suggested that the album was "essential listening" that "continues to deliver the calculated punishment of the band's previous albums, leaving fans as battered, yet willing victims." Describing the album as a "frenzied testament to guitar-based violence", Gregory Heaney praised Book Burner for its sonic clarity, "allowing each gloriously destructive riff to come through crystal clear rather than getting lost in the pummeling drums stampede" and "giving listeners the opportunity to not just feel the bottomless wells of aggression and unfiltered anger that Pig Destroyer channel into their music, but to actually hear and appreciate how technical they are." Comparing Book Burner to Phantom Limb, Craig Hayes of Popmatters observed that the former is more "stripped down" yet "equally masterful" in its songwriting, ultimately "propel[ling] an already lauded band into the realms of the truly legendary."

A more critical tack was taken by Yorgo Douramacos of Slant Magazine, who described the album as "ugly, abrasive, and entirely unpleasant" and questioned whether the album concept was supported by the musical approach: "It's perfectly legitimate that the members of Pig Destroyer should fear censorship and the loss of civil liberties, but can savagery in art ever be an effective antidote to a savage world?"

In popular culture
"The Diplomat" was featured on the season three finale of American sitcom Workaholics. The song was featured during a scene that was described as "a huge rat-killing spree".

Track listing

Personnel

Pig Destroyer
J.R. Hayes – vocals
Scott Hull – guitar, noises
Adam Jarvis – drums
Blake Harrison – noises, vocals

Additional musicians
Jason Netherton (Misery Index) – vocals ("The Diplomat")
Richard Johnson (Agoraphobic Nosebleed) – vocals ("The Underground Man")
Katherine Katz (Agoraphobic Nosebleed) – vocals ("Eve", "The Bug")

References

Pig Destroyer albums
2012 albums
Relapse Records albums